Life Plan A and B is a 2016 Taiwanese melodrama created and produced by TTV. It stars Rainie Yang, Yan Yulin and Johnny Lu. It is the second instalment in Q Series. First original broadcast began on October 7, 2016 on TTV airing every Friday night from 10:00-11:50 pm.

Synopsis
Ru Wei and You Yan have a simple relationship. But in every simple relationship there are many difficulties. They are not rich, but they try very hard to enjoy life; even if it means for their three meals a day they only eat instant noodles, they can still make hundreds of flavours. They are very serious about their relationship and trying their best to achieve something in life – hoping one day they can become who they want to become. One day, Ru Wei has a 'lucky chance' in life. Her company wants to send her to Shanghai, with a promotion and higher pay. These two who are deeply in love cannot bear to have a long distance relationship. With all the uncertainties in their future, can they still stand by each other? If your life "schedule" suddenly changes and forces you to choose between love and career, how can you choose one? Will you also be swaying between the two, unable to decide what to do? If only we can know the outcomes of both options before we choose one, how much better and easier would that be...

Cast
Rainie Yang as Zheng Ru-Wei
Yan Yulin as Tang You-Yan
Johnny Lu as Rong Yi-Chao, Ethan
Ru-Wei's supervisor in Shanghai
Chang Fu-chien as Tang De-Gang
You Yan's father
Chen Chi-hsia as Zhou Ya-Qing
You Yan's mother
Ricie Fun as Gao Mei-Yu
Hsieh Ying-hsuan as Ms. Zhang
Andy Wu as Zhao Hui
Diane Lin as Tang You-Shan
You-Yan's younger sister
Heaven Hai as Real estate agent

Soundtrack
Opening theme: "Traces of Time in Love 年輪說" by Rainie Yang
Ending theme: "The Lessons of Love 相愛的方法" by Rainie Yang
"Being Single 單" by Rainie Yang
"How Sad 多難得" by Yvonne Hsieh

Episode ratings

Awards and nominations

References

External links
 Life Plan A and B Facebook

2016 Taiwanese television series debuts
2016 Taiwanese television series endings
Taiwan Television original programming
Gala Television original programming
Television shows written by Mag Hsu